Coumba Tombe Diallo (born September 27, 1990) is a French female rugby union player. She represented  at the 2014 Women's Rugby World Cup and was part of the squad that won their fourth Six Nations title in 2014.

References

1990 births
Living people
French female rugby union players
French sportspeople of Mauritanian descent
Sportspeople from Île-de-France
People from Clichy-sous-Bois